Andreas Kümmert (born 20 July 1986) is a German singer and songwriter who is best known for winning season three of The Voice of Germany. He also won Unser Song für Deutschland with the song "Heart of Stone", giving him the possibility to represent his country at the Eurovision Song Contest 2015. However, he declined the opportunity and the runner-up Ann Sophie took his place.

Career
Kümmert started his career playing the drums or singing in various punk rock bands throughout Germany. He achieved minor success in music competitions while performing with the grunge band Silent Cry. In 2013, Kümmert began to participate in season three of The Voice of Germany. Several of the songs he covered throughout the competition went on to chart in Germany, Austria, and Switzerland. Kümmert later won the competition. He later released his début album The Mad Hatter's Neighbour in 2014 which reached the Top 20 in Germany. In January 2015, Kümmert was announced as one of the seven established German artists competing in Unser Song für Deutschland with the songs "Home Is In My Hands" and "Heart of Stone". The latter of the two was announced as the winner of the competition and thus would represent Germany at the Eurovision Song Contest 2015, however he declined the opportunity and Ann Sophie and her song "Black Smoke" went on to represent the country in the contest.

Discography

Albums

Singles

References

Living people
21st-century German male singers
German pop singers
German rock singers
1986 births
People from Main-Spessart
The Voice (franchise) winners
Winner03